North Coast is a provincial electoral district for the Legislative Assembly of British Columbia, Canada. It was created by 1990 legislation which came into effect for the 1991 election, largely out of the previous riding of Prince Rupert.

Geography
As of the 2020 provincial election, North Coast comprises the entire area of the Skeena-Queen Charlotte and Central Coast Regional Districts and the southern portion of the Regional District of Kitimat-Stikine, located in the central and northern coast of British Columbia, Haida Gwaii and other islands. Communities in the electoral district consist of Prince Rupert, Bella Coola, Bella Bella, Daajing Giids (formerly Queen Charlotte), Masset, Port Edward, Klemtu and Port Clements.

History

Member of Legislative Assembly 
Its Member of the Legislative Assembly (MLA) is Jennifer Rice.  She was first elected on May 14, 2013.

Election results

References

External links 
BC Stats Profile - 2001 (pdf)
Results of 2001 Election (pdf)
2001 Expenditures
Results of 1996 Election
1996 Expenditures
Results of 1991 Election
1991 Expenditures
Website of the Legislative Assembly of British Columbia

British Columbia provincial electoral districts
Prince Rupert, British Columbia